is a Japanese footballer currently playing as a forward for Giravanz Kitakyushu.

Career statistics

Club
.

Notes

References

External links

1998 births
Living people
Japanese people of Argentine descent
Sportspeople of Argentine descent
Association football people from Tokyo
Meiji University alumni
Japanese footballers
Japan youth international footballers
Argentine footballers
Association football forwards
J2 League players
J3 League players
Giravanz Kitakyushu players